Petropavlovka may refer to:

 Petropavlovka, Russia, the name of several rural localities in Russia
 Dəlləkli, Quba, Azerbaijan, a village called Petropavlovka until 1992
 Sabirabad (city), Azerbaijan, called Petropavlovka until 1931